Relationship most often refers to:

 Family relations and relatives: consanguinity
 Interpersonal relationship, a strong, deep, or close association or acquaintance between two or more people
 Correlation and dependence, relationships in mathematics and statistics between two variables or sets of data
 Semantic relationship, an ontology component
 Romance (love), a connection between two people driven by love and/or sexual attraction

Relationship or Relationships may also refer to:

Arts and media
 "Relationship" (song), by Young Thug featuring Future 
 "Relationships", an episode of the British TV series As Time Goes By
 The Relationship, an American rock band
 The Relationship (album), their 2010 album
 The Relationships, an English band who played at the 2009 Truck Festival
 Relationships, a 1994 album by BeBe & CeCe Winans
 Relationships, a 2001 album by Georgie Fame
 "Relationship", a song by Lakeside on the 1987 album Power
 "Relationship", a song by Mumzy Stranger from his 2008 mixtape
 "Relationship", a song by Young Thug from the 2017 album Beautiful Thugger Girls

Other uses
 Relationship (archaeology), the position in space of an object with respect to another

See also 
 Affinity (disambiguation)
 
 Entity–relationship model
 Relation (disambiguation)